Nitin Kirtane (born 4th March  1974) is an Indian professional tennis player. Kirtane won the gold medal at the 2002 National Games of India and along with Mahesh Bhupathi was the runner-up at the 1992 boys Wimbledon Championship.

Junior Grand Slam finals

Doubles: 1 (1 runner-up)

ATP Challenger and ITF Futures finals

Singles: 1 (0–1)

Doubles: 6 (0–6)

References

External links
 
 

1974 births
Living people
Indian male tennis players
Racket sportspeople from Pune
Asian Games bronze medalists for India
Asian Games medalists in tennis
Medalists at the 1998 Asian Games
Tennis players at the 1998 Asian Games
Recipients of the Dhyan Chand Award